The 1972–73 season was the 64th year of football played by Dundee United, and covers the period from 1 July 1972 to 30 June 1973. United finished in seventh place in the First Division.

Match results
Dundee United played a total of 45 competitive matches during the 1972–73 season.

Legend

All results are written with Dundee United's score first.
Own goals in italics

First Division

Scottish Cup

League Cup

Texaco Cup

References

See also
 1972–73 in Scottish football

Dundee United F.C. seasons
Dundee United